The Deserter is a British First World War poem, written in 1916 by Winifred Mary Letts (1882–1972). It tells the story of a young British soldier who is shot for desertion. It has been included in several anthologies of First World War poems. The poem is used as one of many in Opening Lines, a GCSE English book. It is written in iambic tetrameter.

World War I poems
1916 poems